Ayke, formerly "Pskovskoye" (Псковское), is a village in the Ayteke Bi District, Aktobe Region, Kazakhstan. It is the head of the Ayke Rural District (KATO code - 153441100). Population:

Geography
The village is located by the eastern shore of lake Ayke.

References

Populated places in Aktobe Region